Childhood's End is an American-Australian television miniseries based on the 1953  novel of the same name, by Arthur C. Clarke, and developed by Matthew Graham. It premiered on Syfy on December 14, 2015.

Cast

Main
Mike Vogel as Ricky Stormgren
Osy Ikhile as Milo Rodericks
Daisy Betts as Ellie Stormgren
Yael Stone as Peretta Jones
Georgina Haig as Annabelle Stormgren
Charles Dance as Karellen

Supporting
Colm Meaney as Hugo Wainwright 
Don Hany as Paul Danlow
Darius Amarfio Jefferson as young Milo Rodericks
Ashley Zukerman as Jake Greggson
Hayley Magnus as Amy Morrel
Julian McMahon as Dr. Rupert Boyce 
Charlotte Nicdao as Rachel Osaka
Tanc Sade as Jerry Hallcross
 Robert Rabiah as Saudi Business Man

Development
From the late 1960s, attempts had been made to adapt Childhood's End as a movie, but none of them ever proceeded out of development hell.

On April 10, 2013, Syfy announced its plans to develop a TV miniseries based on Childhood's End. On September 3, 2014, Syfy announced that Childhood's End had been greenlit for three two-hour episodes, for a 2015 airing. The series was going to be written by Matthew Graham, directed by Nick Hurran, and produced by Akiva Goldsman and Mike DeLuca. On October 24, 2014, it was announced that Charles Dance would play Karellen. On November 21, 2014, it was announced that Mike Vogel would play Ricky Stormgren. On January 12, 2015, it was announced that Colm Meaney would play Wainwright and Charlotte Nicdao would play Rachel Osaka. A trailer for the miniseries was released in May 2015.  The series premiered in December 2015.

Episodes

Reception
Childhood's End has a score of 70% on Rotten Tomatoes, with a critical consensus of "While it doesn't quite live up to the book that inspired it, Childhood's End has a balanced narrative and sympathetic performances."

See also
 2015 in science fiction

References

External links

 Website

2010s American television miniseries
2015 American television series debuts
2015 American television series endings
Adaptations of works by Arthur C. Clarke
2010s American drama television series
Dystopian television series
English-language television shows
Post-apocalyptic television series
Syfy original programming
Television shows based on British novels
Television series about extraterrestrial life
Television series set in the 2010s
Television series set in the 2030s
Television series set in the 22nd century
Television shows filmed in Australia
Television shows set in California
Television shows set in Missouri
Television shows set in New York City
Television shows set in South Africa
Television shows set in Washington, D.C.
Television series by Universal Content Productions
Demons in television